(French) or  (Dutch) is one of the 19 municipalities of the Brussels-Capital Region, Belgium. Located in the southern part of the region, it is bordered by the City of Brussels, Anderlecht, Forest and Ixelles. In common with all of Brussels' municipalities, it is legally bilingual (French–Dutch).

Saint-Gilles has a multicultural identity stemming from its diverse population. The housing stock varies from semi-derelict tenements near Brussels-South railway station in the north, to elegant bourgeois houses on the southern borders with Uccle and Ixelles, to tourist hotels at the inner end of the Chaussée de Charleroi/Charleroisesteenweg.

History

Beginnings as Obbrussel
The first houses of the hamlet of Obbrussel (meaning "Upper Brussels") were built, between the 7th and the 11th centuries, close to the /, one of the points of highest elevation in Brussels, now part of Forest. In 1216, following strong demographic growth in the area, Forest Abbey allowed Obbrussel to become an independent parish. This independence, however, was to last only eighty years, after which the administration of the village was given to Brussels. By the 16th century, Obbrussel had grown to 41 houses.

In 1670, following orders from the Spanish government, the Count of Monterey built a fort in Obbrussel as part of the fortifications of Brussels to protect the City of Brussels against possible attacks. Erected in 1675, this fort was dismantled in the following century to give way to several important toll roads and urban development. The name of the / neighbourhood (literally "Barrier of Saint Gilles") still commemorates those tolls to this day.

French Regime until today
During the French regime, on 31 August 1795, the village, by now called Saint-Gilles after its patron saint and main church, merged with neighbouring villages to form Uccle.  Four years later, it gained its independence again, with its own mayor and municipal council. In 1830, Brussels became the capital of newly founded Belgium.  As a result, the rural village of Saint-Gilles, known for centuries for its cabbage cultivation, went through an unprecedented construction spree. The population increased from 2,500 around 1800 to more than 33,000 in 1880 to a peak of 60,000 in 1910.

The street pattern was completely remodelled in the 1860s by the architect and urbanist Victor Besme. It was around that time that the Avenue Louise/Louizalaan, Brussels-South railway station, and the new Church of Saint Gilles were built, to be followed soon after by the new jail and Municipal Hall. Today, Saint-Gilles is one of the densest municipalities of the Brussels agglomeration.

Sights

 Particular architectural delights are found in the dozen or more Art Nouveau houses designed by masters such as Victor Horta and Paul Hankar, dotted around the upper part of the municipality. The house that Horta designed for himself, now the Horta Museum, is located there, on the /. Several of those houses have been recognised as World Heritage Sites by UNESCO in 2000.
 The imposing Municipal Hall, built between 1900 and 1904, looks larger than it is, and bears a splendid resemblance to a French château with Venetian overtones.
 The extant Gothic revival jail and the demolished / (home of the Royal Mint of Belgium) both date from the 1880s, while the Church of Saint Giles was built in 1867.
 There is not a lot of open space in the municipality, although Forest/Vorst Park abuts its western side.

Statistics

Population
Nationality: Saint-Gilles has the largest foreign population of any Brussels municipality. Of the 49,933 registered residents in April 2017, 24,046 (48.2%) were non-Belgian. The largest foreign communities are those from France (c. 5,000), Portugal (c. 2,700), Italy and Spain (c. 2,000), Morocco (c. 1,800), Poland (c. 2,600), Romania (c. 2,200), Greece and Germany (c. 500) and Brazil (c. 400).
Age: The population is relatively young—the average age is 35.95 years—with nearly 10,000 residents under 18 years old, and fewer than average over 65.
Sex: Saint-Gilles is rare in being home to more men (25,052, 50.2%) than women (24,881, 49.8%).
Income: The average income per inhabitant lies between €9,000 and €11,500 per year, making it the second-poorest municipality in Brussels (after only Saint-Josse-ten-Noode).

Economy and labour market
Businesses: In December 2014, the municipality was home to 4,452 VAT-registered businesses.
Employment: 34,050 employees and 4,220 self-employed people worked there. Employment is comparatively fast-growing; it rose by 26% between 2006 and 2013, whereas for the Brussels region as a whole it stood still. The municipality has a high female labour market participation rate; 59% against 68% for men. The employment rate in 2015 was 49%. Unemployment stood at 24.2% in 2015, having fallen from 28.2% in 2005.
Tourism: Hotel nights have risen by nearly 20% between 2007 and 2015. In that year, 754,429 hotel nights were recorded, of which 584,889 (7%) were foreigners.
Property prices: Between 2010 and 2014, the average sale price of a flat in Saint-Gilles was €191,381. In 2014, around 500 properties changed hands.
Rents: Most accommodation in the municipality is rented. The average rent of a two-bedroom flat in 2013 was €669 (as against €732 for Brussels as a whole). There were 1,123 social housing units in 2015.

Politics
The local council usually has a socialist majority, and the current mayor is Charles Picqué, who is a former Minister-President of the Brussels-Capital Region.

Education
The municipality has 13 nursery and primary schools (10 French-speaking and 3 Dutch-speaking) and 7 secondary schools (6 French-speaking and 1 Dutch-speaking).

The Faculty of Architecture, Architectural Engineering and Urban Planning of the University of Louvain (UCLouvain) is established in Saint-Gilles.

Transport
Saint-Gilles's dense population is well served by public transport. Brussels-South railway station with its international high speed connections sits at the northern tip of the municipal territory, and the underground premetro (underground tram) line passes southwards through it. By 2025, the line should have been converted into heavy metro line 3, running from Albert northwards to Gare du Nord/Noordstation (Brussels-North Station), later to be extended to Bordet.

Inhabitants have access to the tram lines 3, 4, 8, 51, 81 and 97, as well as bus lines 48 to Stalle, 134 to St-Job, 136/137 to Alsemberg, 365a to Charleroi and W to Waterloo. There are 5 pods of Cambio shared cars, at Dumont, Horta, Janson, / and /.

Sports
Saint-Gilles has a football club called Royal Union Saint Gilloise, which had his prime years in the 1930s.

Notable inhabitants

 Paul Delvaux (1897–1994), surrealist painter
 Victor Horta (1861–1947), Art Nouveau architect
 Jef Lambeaux (1852–1908), sculptor
 Alme Meyvis (1877–1932), landscape painter
 Pierre Paulus (1881–1959), expressionist painter
 Rob Redding (b. 1976), American abstract painter and media proprietor
 Paul-Henri Spaak (1899–1972), politician, statesman, Prime Minister, and Secretary General of NATO

References

Notes

Bibliography

External links

 Official website 

 
Municipalities of the Brussels-Capital Region
Populated places in Belgium
World Heritage Sites in Belgium